The Boston Manufacturing Company was a business that operated one of the first factories in America. It was organized in 1813 by Francis Cabot Lowell, a wealthy Boston merchant, in partnership with a group of investors later known as The Boston Associates, for the manufacture of cotton textiles. It built the first integrated spinning and weaving factory in the world at Waltham, Massachusetts, using water power. They used plans for a power loom that he smuggled out of England as well as trade secrets from the earlier horse-powered Beverly Cotton Manufactory, of Beverly, Massachusetts, of 1788.<ref>Robert W Lovett, "The Beverly Cotton Manufactory: Or some new light on an early cotton mill Bulletin of the Business Historical Society pre ( Dec 1952) 26, 000004; ABI/INFORM(pg. 218)</ref>   This was the largest factory in the U.S., with a workforce of about 300.  It was a very efficient, highly profitable mill that, with the aid of the Tariff of 1816, competed effectively with British textiles at a time when many smaller operations were being forced out of business.  While the Rhode Island System that followed was famously employed by Samuel Slater, the Boston Associates improved upon it with the "Waltham System". The idea was successfully copied at Lowell, Massachusetts, and elsewhere in New England.  Many rural towns now had their own textile mills.

Origins
Since 1793, when Samuel Slater established the first water-powered successful textile spinning mill in America at Pawtucket, Rhode Island, water power had been operating machinery to process cotton fiber into yarn, which would then be outsourced to small weaving shops and private homes where it would be woven into cloth on hand-operated looms. By 1810, dozens of spinning mills dotted the New England countryside. However, cloth production was still fairly slow with this system.

While on a visit to Lancashire, England, in 1810, Francis Cabot Lowell studied the workings of the successful British textile industry. He paid particular attention to the power loom, a device for which there was yet no equal in America. He knew that increased cloth production in the United States depended on such a machine. Upon his return trip to Boston in 1812, he committed the plans to memory, disguising himself as a country farmer, since the British banned export of the new technology at the time.

In September 1813 The Boston Associates purchased the Boies Paper Mill site in Waltham. With a ten-foot drop in the nearby Charles River, it was an ideal location to establish the new factory they envisioned.

Revolution
The group hired a skilled mechanic named Paul Moody of Amesbury to develop and construct the machinery and to supervise the construction of the new mill.

After over a year of trials, Moody was able to bring Lowell's description of the power loom to fruition, making his own advancements along the way. It would be the perfection of Moody's power loom that would be the real "revolution" in American industry. For the first time, all phases of cloth production could be brought under one roof. Moody also developed a system of power transmission using a series of leather belts and pulleys powered by water turbines, that would prove much more efficient than the shaft and gear system then in use. The first mill was completed in late 1814, after almost a year of construction. Jacob Perkins was in charge of installing the first waterwheel, dam, flumes and raceway.

By early 1815, the cloth was sold. Production expanded quickly, as did profits. In 1816 a second larger mill was built next to the first mill. In addition to producing cloth, it also produced textile machinery for other companies. The two mills were later connected in 1843, as part of a planned expansion.

The power loom was soon copied by many other New England area mills, and modified and perfected along the way. Francis Cabot Lowell died in 1817, at age 42.

The Waltham System

The Boston Associates attempted to create a well-controlled system of labor which varied from the harsh conditions observed while in Lancashire. The mill owners recruited young Yankee farm girls from the surrounding area to come work the machines at Waltham. The mill girls, as they came to be known, lived in boarding houses provided by the company and were supervised by older women, and were subject to strict codes of conduct. They worked approximately eighty hours per week. The workers would wake to the factory bell at 4:40 in the morning. They would report to work at 5:00 and have a half-hour breakfast break at 7:00 a.m. They would then work until the half-hour- to forty-five-minute lunch break at noon. At 7:00 p.m. the factory would shut down and the workers would return to their company houses. This routine was followed six days a week. This system became known as the Waltham System.

By the early 1820s the water power of the Charles River at Waltham was just about maximized, and the investors sought a new location to build even more mills. As the Merrimack Manufacturing Company, in 1822 they copied the Waltham System at the new city of Lowell, Massachusetts, on a much larger scale. The same group of investors would later establish Lawrence, Massachusetts; Manchester, New Hampshire; and several other new industrial centers throughout New England during the first half of the 19th century. The factory methods introduced at Waltham would also be copied by other industries in the years to follow.

The Waltham site would be expanded again during the late 19th century. The original mills were connected, the gable roofs removed, and additional floors were added with flat roofs. The Boston Manufacturing Company closed in 1930.

It was declared a National Historic Landmark in 1977.  A National Register of Historic Places Inventory-Nomination document is available upon request from the National Park Service for this site, and should be online but there is an error at the NPS Focus server for this document.  However, available are the    Some of the company's worker housing has also been listed on the National Register of Historic Places.

Today, the site is occupied by the Charles River Museum of Industry and Innovation, United States Department of Housing and Urban Development-subsidized housing for seniors, the Ira B. Gordon Center For the Arts (part of the Waltham Mills Artists Association), and other housing.

See also
Lowell Mill Girls
Lowell Mills
List of National Historic Landmarks in Massachusetts
National Register of Historic Places listings in Waltham, Massachusetts

References

Further reading
 Bergquist Jr, H. E. "The Boston Manufacturing Company and Anglo-American Relations 1807–1820." Business History 15.1 (1973): 45-55. 
 Dalzell, Robert F. Enterprising elite: The Boston Associates and the world they made (1987).
 Prince, Carl E., and Seth Taylor. "Daniel Webster, the Boston Associates, and the US Government's Role in the Industrializing Process, 1815-1830." Journal of the Early Republic'' 2.3 (1982): 283-299.

External links
 The Beginning of a Revolution: Waltham and the Boston Manufacturing Company. By Kenton Beerman. 1994. The Concord Review

 Charles River Museum of Industry and Innovation
Boston Manufacturing Company records at Baker Library Special Collections, Harvard Business School
 David Stephen Unger, “A Place of Work: The Geography of an Early Nineteenth Century Machine Shop” (Harvard Dissertation 2013)
 Amy Green, "Francis Cabot Lowell and the Boston Manufacturing Company (1813-1820s)" (Information sheet, Charles River Museum) 

Economic history of Massachusetts
Buildings and structures in Waltham, Massachusetts
Waltham, Massachusetts
Industrial buildings and structures on the National Register of Historic Places in Massachusetts
Historic districts in Middlesex County, Massachusetts
Manufacturing companies established in 1813
History of the textile industry in the United States
National Historic Landmarks in Massachusetts
Companies based in Middlesex County, Massachusetts
Cotton mills in the United States
Historic American Engineering Record in Massachusetts
Industrial archaeological sites in the United States
National Register of Historic Places in Waltham, Massachusetts
Museums in Middlesex County, Massachusetts
Historic districts on the National Register of Historic Places in Massachusetts
Defunct manufacturing companies based in Massachusetts